Gaillardia aristata is a North American species of flowering plant in the sunflower family, known by the common names common blanketflower and common gaillardia. This perennial wildflower is widespread across much of North America, from Yukon east to Québec and south as far as California, Arizona, Illinois, and Connecticut, although it may be naturalized rather than native in parts of that range. It is also naturalized in scattered locations in Europe, Australia, and South America.

Description

Gaillardia aristata grows in many habitats such as plains, prairies, and meadows. It has lance-shaped leaves near the base and several erect, naked stems holding the flowers.

Flowers bloom July to September.

Uses
Some Plateau Indian tribes used blanketflower to treat wounds and settle fevers.

Gaillardia aristata is a widely cultivated ornamental plant, used as a perennial garden flower.

References

External links
 
 Calphotos Photo gallery, University of California
 United States Department of Agriculture, National Forest Service, Plant of the Week, Blanketflower (Gaillardia aristata)
 Minnesota Wildflowers, Gaillardia aristata (Blanketflower)

aristata
Flora of Canada
Flora of the United States
Flora of California
Flora of the Great Plains (North America)
Flora of Ontario
Plants described in 1813
Taxa named by Frederick Traugott Pursh
Garden plants of North America
Flora without expected TNC conservation status